Events from the year 1701 in Russia

Incumbents
 Monarch – Peter I

Events

 
 Battle of Petschora
 Battle of Rauge
 Novozybkov

Births

Deaths

References

 
Years of the 18th century in Russia